The Hakka Transliteration Scheme or Pinfa refers to a romanization scheme published by the Guangdong Provincial Education Department in September 1960 as one of four systems collectively referred to as Guangdong Romanization. The scheme describes the Meixian dialect spoken in Meizhou, Guangdong, which is considered to be the prestige dialect of Hakka, and was later adapted for Gan and Xiang. This system utilizes the Latin alphabet with superscript numbers to represent tone.

System

Letters
It also adds the letter  to represent [ɛ].

Initials
There are 19 initials used, in addition to the null initial which occurs when no consonant is in the initial position. These are shown below:

Finals
There are a total of 74 finals, shown below:

Tones

See also
Guangdong Romanization
Hakka Chinese
Meixian dialect
Pha̍k-fa-sṳ
Taiwanese Hakka Romanization System

References

Further reading

 

Hakka Chinese
Latin-script orthographies
Romanization of Chinese